Wancourt is a commune in the Pas-de-Calais department in the Hauts-de-France region of France.

Geography
The A1 autoroute passes by just yards from the commune.

Toponymy 
Wahencurt (1072), Wahencourt (around 1110), Waencurt (1148), Waencourt (1226).

Population

Places of interest
 The church of St.Aubode, rebuilt, along with much of the village, after World War I.
 Commonwealth War Graves Commission cemeteries, including Hibers Trench Cemetery.

See also
Communes of the Pas-de-Calais department

References

External links

 The CWGC cemetery at Wancourt
 The CWGC Guémappe cemetery
 Feuchy CWGC cemetery

Communes of Pas-de-Calais